Lebanese amber is fossilized resin found in Lebanon and southwest Syria. It dates back approximately 130-125 million years to the Barremian of the Early Cretaceous. It formed on what was then the northern coast of Gondwana, believed to be a tropical or subtropical zone in a temperate or hot climate. It is the oldest source of amber with a significant number of inclusions. Up to 300 sources of Lebanese amber have been recovered and 17 of them are important sources of organic inclusions, which are the oldest of their kind. The inclusions help to document Cretaceous fauna and flora.

Origins 
Lebanese amber can be found in Lebanon and neighboring areas of Syria and north Palestine. Up to 300 different sources of amber had been discovered by 2010. The amber was deposited in the Cretaceous era and is rich in fossil synclusions. 19 of the discovered sources are rich in inclusions from the Early Cretaceous. All of them are located in Lebanon, which makes it the largest source of inclusion from that period.

History 
Aside from possible early reports of Phoenician usage, the oldest reports of Lebanese amber are from 19th-century accounts, these tended only to be incidental due to Lebanese amber's poor gemological quality in comparison to Baltic amber, and the local people were more interested in the associated lignite as a source of fuel.

Properties 
Lebanese amber can be found in a vast variety of colors such as yellow, orange, dark red or iridescent jet black. Rarely in white, milky or cream. The variation of color tone is caused by the air contained in the amber. The density of Lebanese amber is 1.054 g/cm3. It tends to be fragile and easy to damage.

Inclusions 

Inclusions are quite common for Lebanese amber, which is rich in organisms of the Barremian epoch. Next to Jordanian amber, Lebanese amber is the oldest amber to have yielded significant invertebrate inclusions alongside the Wealden amber from the equivalently aged Wessex Formation of the UK, which is much less productive. Organisms preserved in Lebanese amber are dated back to the period prior to the angiosperm radiation, which was the period of massive extinction of old groups of arthropods, as well as the emergence of the new ones, some of which co-evolved with angiosperms. The organisms are preserved in good condition and shape. The diversity and number of co-inclusions help to draw conclusions about mutual relations and co-existence.

References 

Amber
Barremian Stage 
Barremian life 
Lower Cretaceous Series of Asia
Paleontology in Lebanon